Scott Sankey (born 17 November 1990) is an English male badminton player.

Achievements

BWF International Challenge/Series
Men's Doubles

 BWF International Challenge tournament
 BWF International Series tournament
 BWF Future Series tournament

References

External links 

 

1990 births
Living people
English male badminton players